Hababam Sınıfı (The Chaos Class) is a 1975 Turkish comedy film, directed by Ertem Eğilmez based on a novel by Rıfat Ilgaz, featuring an ensemble cast including Kemal Sunal, Tarık Akan and Münir Özkul that tells the adventures of a private school class students who are challenged by the arrival of a new headmaster. The enduring popularity of the series resulted in three later sequels; Hababam Sınıfı Merhaba ("The Chaos Class Welcome", 2004), Hababam Sınıfı Askerde ("The Chaos Class in the Military", 2005) and Hababam Sınıfı Üç Buçuk ("The Chaos Class Three and a Half," 2006)

Plot
A group of lazy, ignorant highschool students, in no rush to graduate, have settled into life at their private school,  paid by aloof parents, where they have bonded as a family and are cared for by school attendant Mother Hafize who has accepted them as her real sons. Their kingdom over the school is challenged by a new vice principal who, despite his warm hearted nature, takes on the role of tough disciplinarian and becomes the butt of their tricks and jokes as he prepares them for life.

Cast
 Kemal Sunal as İnek Şaban
 Münir Özkul as Mahmut Hoca
 Tarık Akan as Damat Ferit
 Adile Naşit as Hafize Ana
 Halit Akçatepe as Güdük Necmi
 Ahmet Arıman as Hayta İsmail
 Cem Gürdap as Tulum Hayri
 Feridun Şavlı as Domdom Ali
 Sitki Akçatepe as Paşa Nuri (Physics teacher)
 Ertuğrul Bilda as Külyutmaz Hoca (Biology teacher)
 Kemal Ergüvenç as Kemal Hoca
 Akil Öztuna as Lütfü Hoca (Philosophy teacher)
 Muharrem Gürses as the headmaster

References

External links
 

1975 films
1975 comedy films
Films based on Turkish novels
Films set in Istanbul
1970s Turkish-language films
Turkish comedy films
Films set in universities and colleges
Films shot in Istanbul